General Churchill may refer to:

Charles Churchill (British Army officer, born 1656) (1656–1714), British Army general
Charles Churchill (British Army officer, born 1679) (1679–1745), British Army lieutenant general
George Churchill (British Army officer) (died 1753), British Army lieutenant general
Horatio Churchill (1759–1817), British Army major general
John Churchill, 1st Duke of Marlborough (1650–1722), English Army general
Marlborough Churchill (1878–1947), U.S. Army brigadier general
Sylvester Churchill (1783–1862), Union Army brevet brigadier general
Thomas James Churchill (1824–1905), Confederate States Army major general